Protein HIRA is a protein that in humans is encoded by the HIRA gene. This gene is mapped to 22q11.21, centromeric to COMT.

Function 

The specific function of this protein has yet to be determined; however, it has been speculated to play a role in transcriptional regulation and/or chromatin and histone metabolism.

Research done by Salomé Adam, Sophie E. Polo, and Geneviève Almouzni indicate that HIRA proteins are involved in restarting transcription after UVC damage. Function of HIRA gene can be effectively examined by siRNA knockdown based on an independent validation.

Clinical significance 

It is considered the primary candidate gene in some haploinsufficiency syndromes such as DiGeorge syndrome, and insufficient production of the gene may disrupt normal embryonic development.

Model organisms

Model organisms have been used in the study of HIRA function. A conditional knockout mouse line, called Hiratm1a(EUCOMM)Wtsi was generated as part of the International Knockout Mouse Consortium program — a high-throughput mutagenesis project to generate and distribute animal models of disease to interested scientists.

Male and female animals underwent a standardized phenotypic screen to determine the effects of deletion. Twenty two tests were carried out on mutant mice and two significant abnormalities were observed. No homozygous mutant mice survived until weaning. The remaining tests were carried out on heterozygous mutant adult mice and a decreased leukocyte cell number was recorded in male animals.

Interactions 

HIRA has been shown to interact with HIST1H2BK.

References

Further reading 

 
 
 
 
 
 
 
 
 
 
 
 

Genes mutated in mice